The Beth El Cemetery is a Jewish cemetery located at 4700 South 84th Street (84th and "L" Streets) in Ralston, a city that is south of Omaha, Nebraska.

History 
Beth El Synagogue bought land for the cemetery in 1927, and the cemetery was opened in 1939.

The cemetery is part of the Conservative community of Omaha. It is a medium-sized cemetery that is situated on three acres.

In May 1999, the Etta and Harold Epstein Family Chapel of Remembrance was dedicated on the grounds, enabling congregants to hold indoor services at the cemetery.

Notable burials 
 Johnny Rosenblatt (1907–1979) Mayor of Omaha (1954–61). Rosenblatt Stadium was named after him
 Edward Zorinsky (1928–1987) American politician and US Senator.
 The cemetery also has graves for Jewish soldiers and officers from Omaha who were killed in World War I, World War II, and other wars

See also 
 History of the Jews in Omaha, Nebraska
 List of cemeteries in Omaha
 History of Omaha

References

External links 
 Beth-El Cemetery
 

1939 establishments in Nebraska
Jews and Judaism in Omaha, Nebraska
Jewish cemeteries in Omaha, Nebraska